Karl Lustenberger (born 10 October 1952) was a Swiss nordic combined skier who competed in the late 1970s and early 1980s. He finished sixth in the Nordic combined event at the 1980 Winter Olympics in Lake Placid, New York.

Lustenberger also won the Nordic combined event at the 1979 Holmenkollen ski festival.

References

External links

Holmenkollen winners since 1892 - click Vinnere for downloadable pdf file 

Nordic combined skiers at the 1976 Winter Olympics
Nordic combined skiers at the 1980 Winter Olympics
Holmenkollen Ski Festival winners
Living people
Swiss male Nordic combined skiers
Swiss male ski jumpers
1952 births
Olympic ski jumpers of Switzerland
Olympic Nordic combined skiers of Switzerland
Ski jumpers at the 1980 Winter Olympics